Kotochitose Kosei (born 22 April 1957 as Minoru Yamamoto) is a former sumo wrestler from Chitose, Hokkaidō, Japan. He made his professional debut in July 1971 and reached the top division in May 1981. His highest rank was maegashira 5. He retired from active competition in July 1986. He became a wakaimonogashira (assistant) at Sadogatake stable after his retirement.

Career record

See also
Glossary of sumo terms
List of past sumo wrestlers
List of sumo tournament second division champions

References

1957 births
Living people
Japanese sumo wrestlers
Sumo people from Hokkaido
People from Chitose, Hokkaido
Sadogatake stable sumo wrestlers